The Democracy Photo Challenge is a contest that invites people to complete the phrase "Democracy is..." through digital photos submitted online. Google’s Picasa Web Albums created the online platform for the contest, a first for the photo sharing website.  In 2010, nearly 3,000 people from 131 countries entered the contest online.

The Photo Challenge is a spinoff of the Democracy Video Challenge, an annual contest in which contestants complete the phrase “Democracy is…” through short online videos.

Process 
Submissions for the 2010 contest were accepted online from July 7 to July 28, 2010. An independent jury narrowed the submissions to 36 finalists representing each region of the world.  The online public then voted for their favorites.  In total, more than half a million people took part in the voting.

The 12 winners were announced on September 15, 2010 during International Day of Democracy.  The winning photographs were displayed at the United Nations.

Jury 
The 2010 jury was co-chaired by documentary photographer Phil Borges, International Center of Photography director Willis Hartshorn and Academy Award-winning director Louie Psihoyos.

Winners

Partners  
 The Annenberg Space for Photography
 Bridges to Understanding
 Center for International Private Enterprise
 Getty Images
 International Center of Photography
 International Republican Institute
 International Youth Foundation
 Motion Picture Association of America
 National Democratic Institute
 NBC Universal
 New York University-Tisch School of the Arts
 One Economy
 Recording Industry Association of America
 TakingITGlobal
 University of Southern California
 U.S. Department of State
 YouTube

References

External links 
 Democracy Photo Challenge website

Photojournalism awards